The rough abyssal grenadier (Coryphaenoides yaquinae) is a species of deep-sea grenadier fish in the family Macrouridae. First described as a separate species in 1974, the rough abyssal grenadier was historically confused with its congener, Coryphaenoides armatus. Unlike C. armatus, which has been recorded in the waters of the Atlantic, Pacific, Indian, and Southern oceans, observations of C. yaquinae have been confined exclusively to the Pacific ocean. C. yaquinae tends to inhabit abyssopelagic depths between 3,400 and 5,800 meters. However, observations of C. yaquinae have been made as deep as 7,000 meters below sea level.

Ecology 
The rough abyssal grenadier is an active benthic forager, with a diet that features a variety of seafloor fauna. Squids, crustaceans, and polychaetes comprise the most consistent sources of prey for C. yaquinae, though stomach content analyses have revealed echinoderms, fish, and food scavenged from carrion.

References 

Wikipedia Student Program
Macrouridae
Fish described in 1974